Bonita Jacobs is president of the University of North Georgia (UNG). UNG was formed in January 2013 through consolidation of Gainesville State College and North Georgia College & State University.

She took office as the 17th president of North Georgia College & State University in July 2011. She was the university's first female president and is only the second to lead one of the country's six Senior Military Colleges.

Career
Jacobs received bachelor's degrees in Spanish and history and a master's degree in counseling from Stephen F. Austin State University. She earned her doctorate in educational administration from Texas A&M University.

Prior to coming to the University of North Georgia, Jacobs served as executive director of the National Institute for the Study of Transfer Students (2009-2011), vice president for student development (1998-2009), and as professor in counseling and higher education at the University of North Texas. She currently serves on the College Board's Community College Advisory Panel.

Earlier, she served as interim vice chancellor for student development and dean of students at Western Carolina University and in positions at Stephen F. Austin State University.

As of 2022, Jacobs has announced her plans to retire as president of the University of North Georgia.

Awards
In 2014, Dr. Jacobs was named as one of the "100 Most Influential Georgians" by Georgia Trend magazine. In 2013 and 2014 she was named as one of the "Top Education Leaders in Atlanta" by the Atlanta Business Chronicle.

References

Year of birth missing (living people)
Living people
University of North Georgia
Heads of universities and colleges in the United States
Stephen F. Austin State University alumni
Texas A&M University alumni